Henry Aylmer, 2nd Baron Aylmer (c. 1694 – 26 June 1754) was a British Whig politician.

Early life
Henry Aylmer was born in around 1694, the son of Admiral of the Fleet Matthew Aylmer, 1st Baron Aylmer.

Political career
Aylmer succeeded his father in the barony on 16 August 1720. He was instead returned to Parliament for Rye in 1722, a seat he held until 1727. He was also an Equerry to King George I from 1714 to 1727 and served as Comptroller of the Mint between 1727 and 1754.

Personal life
Aylmer married Elizabeth, daughter of William Priestman, in June 1716. Elizabeth died in January 1750. Aylmer survived her by four years and died on 26 June 1754. He was succeeded in the barony by his eldest surviving son, the couple having had four sons:
Captain Matthew Aylmer (1717–1748), British Army officer in the Foot Guards
Captain Henry Aylmer, 3rd Baron Aylmer (21 May 1718–7 October 1766), Royal Navy officer
Philip Aylmer (b. 1721, d. young), unmarried
Reverend John Aylmer (25 May 1723–16 February 1793), prebendary of Bristol and rector of St Alban, Wood Street

References

1754 deaths
Barons Aylmer
British MPs 1722–1727
Whig (British political party) MPs for English constituencies
Year of birth missing
English people of Irish descent
Members of the Parliament of Great Britain for English constituencies